Oldham College, is a further education college based in Oldham, Greater Manchester, England.

History
Oldham College was established in 1893 after a donation from the Platt family, a famous textile machinery manufacturer. This led to the institution of the School of Art and Science in the town centre. It was situated on the junction of Ashcroft St. and the former Chapel St., the site is now occupied by the Town Square Shopping Centre.

Present day
Oldham College was inspected by OFSTED in 2019 and was rated good in all areas.
Oldham College offer a range of courses, including vocational courses, T Levels, Apprenticeships, adult courses and university courses.

Around £45 million has been invested in upgrading or completely replacing facilities since 2012. In 2021, the latest new building – a £9m Construction Centre – was completed alongside the addition of a new £9m Health and Life Sciences Centre. Other recent changes include new simulation suites which mirror a real-life clinical hospital ward, nursery and care home.

Notable alumni
 Suranne Jones – actress (Scott & Bailey) 
 Sarah Lancashire – actress (Coronation Street)
 Jane Horrocks – actress (Little Voice and Absolutely Fabulous)
 Paul S. Walsh – CEO of Diageo plc
 Suzanne Shaw – singer (Hear'Say)
 Kelly Llorenna – singer
 Danielle Nicholls – television presenter
 Matt Healy – actor (Emmerdale)
 Steve Diggle – musician (Buzzcocks)
 Anthony Flanagan – actor
 Samantha Power – actress (Little Britain and Ackley Bridge)
 Kimberly Hart-Simpson – actress and businesswoman (Coronation Street)

References

External links
http://www.oldham.ac.uk/ (Official Website)

Buildings and structures in Oldham
Educational institutions established in 1893
Education in Oldham
Further education colleges in Greater Manchester
Learning and Skills Beacons
1893 establishments in England